At the 2002 Winter Olympics, eighteen Nordic skiing events were contested – twelve cross-country skiing events, three ski jumping events, and three Nordic combined events.

2002
2002 Winter Olympics events